List of Features on Phobos and Deimos may refer to:

Phobos (moon)#Named geological features
Deimos (moon)#Named geological features